Danielle Rachel Blair (born 16 June 1988) is a Canadian-born Trinidad and Tobago footballer who plays as a defender. She has been a member of the Trinidad and Tobago women's national team.

High school and college career
Blair has attended the St. John Paul II Catholic Secondary School in Scarborough, Ontario and the University of Alabama in Birmingham, Alabama, United States.

International career
Blair capped for Trinidad and Tobago at senior level during the 2010 CONCACAF Women's World Cup Qualifying and the 2011 Pan American Games.

References

1988 births
Living people
Citizens of Trinidad and Tobago through descent
Trinidad and Tobago women's footballers
Women's association football defenders
UAB Blazers women's soccer players
Trinidad and Tobago women's international footballers
Pan American Games competitors for Trinidad and Tobago
Footballers at the 2011 Pan American Games
Trinidad and Tobago expatriate women's footballers
Trinidad and Tobago expatriate sportspeople in the United States
Expatriate women's soccer players in the United States
Sportspeople from Scarborough, Toronto
Soccer players from Toronto
Canadian women's soccer players
Canadian expatriate women's soccer players
Canadian expatriate sportspeople in the United States
Canadian sportspeople of Trinidad and Tobago descent
Black Canadian women's soccer players